Stretton is a civil parish in Cheshire West and Chester, England.  It contains seven listed buildings that are recorded in the National Heritage List for England.  Of these, two are listed at Grade II*, the middle of the three grades, and the others are at Grade II, the lowest grade.  The listed buildings consist of a country house and its garden wall, a smaller house, a farmhouse and associated barn, and a watermill that has been converted into a museum with its associated former stable.


Key

Buildings

References

Citations

Sources

Listed buildings in Cheshire West and Chester
Lists of listed buildings in Cheshire